Stade Malien de Sikasso is a Malian football club. The team is based in the city of Sikasso.

History

Achievements 
 Malien Premiere Division: 

 Malien Cup: 

 Mali SuperCup:

References 
Mali 2007/08 Championnat National Première Division
Mali 2006/07 Championnat National Première Division Rec.Sport.Soccer Statistics Foundation, retrieved 2008-03-04. Rec.Sport.Soccer Statistics Foundation, retrieved 2008-03-04.
Mali – List of Champions Rec.Sport.Soccer Statistics Foundation, retrieved 2008-03-04.
Mali – List of Cup Winners Rec.Sport.Soccer Statistics Foundation, retrieved 2008-03-04.
 http://www.footmali.com (Le football au Mali)

Football clubs in Mali
Sikasso